

Events

January–March 
 January 1 – France begins issue of the Ceres series, the nation's first postage stamps.
 January 5 – Hungarian Revolution of 1848: The Austrian army, led by Alfred I, Prince of Windisch-Grätz, enters in the Hungarian capitals, Buda and Pest. The Hungarian government and parliament flee to Debrecen.
 January 8 – Hungarian Revolution of 1848: Romanian armed groups massacre 600 unarmed Hungarian civilians, at Nagyenyed.
 January 13
 Second Anglo-Sikh War – Battle of Tooele: British forces retreat from the Sikhs.
 The Colony of Vancouver Island is established.
 January 21
 General elections are held in the Papal States.
 Hungarian Revolution of 1848: Battle of Nagyszeben – The Hungarian army in Transylvania, led by Josef Bem, is defeated by the Austrians, led by Anton Puchner.
 January 23 – Elizabeth Blackwell is awarded her M.D. by the Medical Institute of Geneva, New York, thus becoming the United States' first woman doctor.
 January 27
 The Fayetteville and Western Plank Road Company is incorporated, to build a plank road from Fayetteville to Bethania, North Carolina.
 The North Carolina General Assembly incorporates the North Carolina Railroad, to complete a rail line from Goldsboro through Raleigh, and Salisbury to Charlotte.
 January 31 – Hungarian Revolution of 1848: A Russian army of 10,000 soldiers enters Transylvania, in order to help the Austrians defeat the Hungarian forces, led by Josef Bem.
 February 1 – The abolition of the Corn Laws by the United Kingdom's Importation Act 1846 comes fully into effect.
 February 2 – Treaty of Guadalupe Hidalgo signed, ending the Mexican–American War (effective on exchange of ratifications, May 30; proclaimed July 4).
 February 4 – Hungarian Revolution of 1848: Battle of Vízakna – The Austrian army, led by Anton Puchner, defeats the Hungarians, led by general Josef Bem.
 February 5 – Hungarian Revolution of 1848: The Hungarian revolutionary army, led by Richard Guyon, breaks through the pass of Branyiszkó, defeating the Austrian defenders.
 February 8 – The new Roman Republic is proclaimed.
 February 9 – Hungarian Revolution of 1848: Battle of Piski – Josef Bem's Hungarian army defeats Anton Puchner.
 February 14 – In New York City, James Knox Polk becomes the first President of the United States to have his photograph taken.
 February 21 – Second Anglo-Sikh War: Battle of Gujrat – Forces of the British East India Company defeat those of the Sikh Empire in Punjab.
 February 27 – Hungarian Revolution of 1848: Battle of Kápolna – The Austrians defeat the Hungarians.
 February 28 – Regular steamboat service from the west to the east coast of the United States begins, with the arrival of the SS California in San Francisco Bay. The California leaves New York Harbor on October 6, 1848, rounds Cape Horn at the tip of South America, and arrives at San Francisco after the 4-month, 21-day journey.
 March – The Frankfurt Parliament completes its drafting of a liberal constitution, and elects Frederick William IV emperor of the new German national state.
 March 3
 The United States Department of the Interior is established, incorporating the Census Office, General Land Office, Office of Indian Affairs and Patent and Trademark Office.
 Minnesota becomes a United States territory.
 The United States Congress passes the Gold Coinage Act allowing the minting of two additional denominations of gold coins, the gold dollar and the double eagle.
 March 4
 Zachary Taylor becomes the 12th president of the United States, but refuses to be sworn into office on a Sunday. Urban legend holds that David Rice Atchison, President pro tempore of the United States Senate, is President de jure for a single day.
 Hungarian Revolution of 1848: The Habsburg emperor Franz Joseph I of Austria promulgates at Olomouc the March Constitution of Austria, which abolishes the April Laws promulgated by the Hungarian Batthyány-govern, and degrades Hungary to a simple Austrian province.
 March 5
 Hungarian Revolution of 1848 – Battle of Szolnok: The Hungarians led by János Damjanich and Károly Vécsey defeat the Austrians.
 President Zachary Taylor is sworn in.
 March 11 – Hungarian Revolution of 1848: The Hungarian army of Transylvania, under general Josef Bem, defeats the Russian-Austrian army at Nagyszeben, capturing the city which is the headquarters of Austrian general Anton Puchner. Most of Transylvania is liberated from the Austrian rule. The Austrian and the Russian troops flee to Wallachia.
 March 22–23 –  First Italian War of Independence: Battle of Novara – The Kingdom of Sardinia suffers a huge defeat, and Charles Albert abdicates.
 March 28 – Four Christians are ordered to be burnt alive in Antananarivo, Madagascar, by Queen Ranavalona I, and 14 others are executed.
 March 30 – The Second Anglo-Sikh War ends, with the United Kingdom annexing the Punjab.
 March 30 - Maharaja Duleep Singh is exiled to England.

April–June 
 April 1
 After 10 days, the insurrection in Brescia is ended by Austrian troops.
 Hungarian Revolution of 1848: The Hungarian Revolutionary Army, under the leadership of Arthur Görgey, starts the victorious Spring Campaign, which leads to the liberation of much of Hungary from the Austrian forces.
 April 2
 The German revolutions of 1848–49 end in failure, as King Frederick William IV of Prussia refuses to accept the offer of the Frankfurt National Assembly, to be crowned as German emperor.
 Hungarian Revolution of 1848 – Battle of Hatvan: The Hungarian revolutionary army, under the command of András Gáspár, defeats the Austrians, led by general Franz Schlik.
 April 4 – Hungarian Revolution of 1848 – Battle of Tápióbicske: Hungarian forces, under the generals György Klapka and János Damjanich, defeat the Austrian-Croatian army, led by Franz Schlik and Josip Jelačić.
 April 6 – Hungarian Revolution of 1848 – Battle of Isaszeg: The main Hungarian forces, led by Arthur Görgey, defeat the main imperial forces, led by Alfred I, Prince of Windisch-Grätz, forcing them to retreat westward.
 April 10 – Hungarian Revolution of 1848 – Battle of Vác: The Hungarians, led by János Damjanich, defeat the Austrians, led by Christian Götz, who dies after the battle due to his injuries.
 April 12
 Hungarian Revolution of 1848: Because of his series of defeats suffered from the Hungarian army, Alfred I, Prince of Windisch-Grätz is released from the supreme command of the Austrian forces in Hungary, and replaced by Ludwig von Welden.
 Astronomer Annibale de Gasparis discovers the asteroid 10 Hygiea.
 April 14 – Hungarian Revolution of 1848: The Hungarian revolutionary parliament in Debrecen declares independence from the Habsburg Empire.
 April 19 – Hungarian Revolution of 1848 – Battle of Nagysalló: The Hungarian revolutionary army, led by György Klapka and János Damjanich, defeat the Austrian army, led by Lt. Gen. Ludwig von Wohlgemuth.
 April 21
 Great Famine (Ireland): 96 inmates of the overcrowded Ballinrobe Union Workhouse died over the course of the preceding week from illness and other famine-related conditions, a record high.
 The Austrian government asks Russian help against the Hungarian Revolution. Tsar Nicholas I of Russia agrees to send troops against Hungary.
 April 22 – The first Kennedy arrives in America.
 April 25 – James Bruce, 8th Earl of Elgin, the Governor General of Canada, signs the Rebellion Losses Bill, outraging Montreal's English population and triggering the Montreal Riots.
 April 26 – Hungarian Revolution of 1848 – Battle of Komárom: Hungarian forces relieve the city and castle with the same name from a long Austrian siege. The Austrian imperial forces and their Croatian, Romanian and Serbian allies are chased out from Hungary, or near the borders of the country.
 April 27 – Giuseppe Garibaldi enters Rome, to defend it from the French troops of General Charles Oudinot.
 May – The Second Carlist War ends in Spain.
 May 2 – Hungarian Revolution of 1848: A new independent Hungarian government, led by Bertalan Szemere, is formed. The head of state of Hungary becomes Lajos Kossuth, as governor president.
 May 3
 The May Uprising in Dresden, last of the German revolutions of 1848–49, begins. Richard Wagner is among the participants.
 The Mississippi River levee at Sauvé's Crevasse breaks, flooding much of New Orleans.
 May 9 – The May Uprising in Dresden is suppressed by the Kingdom of Saxony.
 May 10 – The Astor Place Riot takes place in Manhattan, over a dispute between two Shakespearean actors; over 20 people are killed.
 May 15 – Troops of the Kingdom of the Two Sicilies take Palermo, and crush the republican government of Sicily.
 May 17 – The St. Louis Fire starts when a steamboat catches fire and nearly burns down the entire city.
 May 21 – Hungarian Revolution of 1848: The Hungarian army, led by Arthur Görgey, captures the Castle of Buda, liberating the Hungarian capital city completely. The leader of the defending Austrian forces, General Heinrich Hentzi, dies because of his injuries. The Hungarian government moves back from Debrecen to Budapest.
 May 30 – Hungarian Revolution of 1848: Julius Jacob von Haynau replaces Ludwig von Welden as leader of the Austrian forces in Hungary, because of the failure of the latter to stop the advance of the Hungarian forces.
 June 5
 Denmark becomes a constitutional monarchy.
 Hungarian Revolution of 1848: The first Russian troops, led by Lieutenant General Fyodor Sergeyevich Panyutin, who come in the aid of the Habsburgs, cross the Hungarian border at Pozsony, in order to crush the Hungarian revolution.
 June 6 – The settlement of Fort Worth, Texas, is founded.
 June 17 – Hungarian Revolution of 1848: The main Russian forces, led by Ivan Paskevich, cross the Hungarian border, and together with the Austrian troops, led by Julius Jacob von Haynau, start the final attack against the Hungarian Revolution. Now the Hungarian revolutionary troops, numbering 173,000 soldiers, which even before the Russian attack were in inferiority regarding their numbers, and the quality of their weapons and war industry, face a force of 370,000 Austro-Russian forces, and other tens of thousands of Croatian, Serbian and Romanian insurgents, who serve the Habsburg imperial interests.
 June 20 – Hungarian Revolution of 1848: Russian troops, under the command of Alexander von Lüders, break in Transylvania, and, together with the Austrian forces, start to operate against the Hungarian troops, led by Józef Bem.
 June 21 – Hungarian Revolution of 1848: The Russo-Austrian army, led by Julius Jacob von Haynau, defeats the Hungarians under the command of Arthur Görgey at Pered.
 June 28 – Hungarian Revolution of 1848: The Austrian army, led by Julius Jacob von Haynau, defeats the Hungarians, led by Ernő Poeltenberg, at Győr. The Hungarian army is forced to retreat towards Budapest.

July–September 
 July 2 – Hungarian Revolution of 1848 – Second Battle of Komárom: The Hungarian army, led by Arthur Görgey, repulses the combined attack of the Austrian and Russian troops led by Julius Jacob von Haynau. During the battle Görgey suffers a heavy head injury, which prevents him from taking advantage of this success.
 July 3 – French troops occupy Rome; the Roman Republic surrenders.
 July 6 – Battle of Fredericia: The Danish Army beats the Prussian army at Fredericia, Jutland, thereby putting an end to the Prussian-Danish War until 1864.
 July 11 – Hungarian Revolution of 1848 – Third Battle of Komárom: The Hungarian army, led by Arthur Görgey, is defeated by the Austrians, led by Julius Jacob von Haynau.
 July 14
 Hungarian Revolution of 1848: Because of the imminent Austrian attack, the Hungarian government moves from Budapest to Szeged.
 Hungarian Revolution of 1848: Hungarian troops, led by Richard Guyon, defeat the Croatian-Austrian army led by Josip Jelačić at Kishegyes, securing southern Hungary for the revolutionary government.
 July 17 – Hungarian Revolution of 1848: Hungarians, led by Arthur Görgey, and the Russians, led by Ivan Paskevich, battle indecisively at Vác. The Russians are unsuccessful in destroying the Hungarian army, which retreats towards the east.
 July 23 – The French scientist Hippolyte Fizeau measures the speed of light, with an instrument placed on the Earth.
 July 28 – Hungarian Revolution of 1848: The Hungarian government, led by Bertalan Szemere promulgates the Nationality Law, which gives important rights to the nationalities of Hungary, like the right to use their mother tongue in school, church, army, court and administration. The Romanians are declared a nation, and not a minority, in Transylvania. The Jews receive equality thanks to the Emancipation Decree.
 July 31 – Hungarian Revolution of 1848 – Battle of Segesvár: The Russian troops in Transylvania, led by Alexander von Lüders, crush the Hungarian forces, under the lead of Józef Bem. Hungarian poet and revolutionary Sándor Petőfi is killed in the battle by the Russians.
 July 31–August 1 – Joven Daniel wrecks at the coast of Araucanía, Chile, leading to allegations that local Mapuche tribes murdered survivors and kidnapped Elisa Bravo.
 August 2 – Hungarian Revolution of 1848: The Russian main forces, under Ivan Paskevich, defeat the Hungarian army under József Nagysándor, at Debrecen.
 August 3 – Hungarian Revolution of 1848: The Hungarian defenders of Komárom, led by György Klapka, destroy the besieging Austrian forces, liberating Győr and Székesfehérvár. But this victory comes too late to change the course of military events in the eastern part of the country, where the Hungarian forces are about to crumble under the heavy Austro-Russian pressure.
 August 5 – Hungarian Revolution of 1848 – Battle of Szőreg: Austrian forces, under Julius Jacob von Haynau, defeat the Hungarian main forces under Henryk Dembiński.
 August 9 – Hungarian Revolution of 1848 – Battle of Temesvár: The main Russo-Austrian forces, led by Julius Jacob von Haynau, win a decisive victory against the Hungarians, led by Józef Bem.
 August 11 – Hungarian Revolution of 1848: Lajos Kossuth and the Hungarian Government of Bertalan Szemere resign, and give all powers to the hands of Arthur Görgey. After this Kossuth, the ministries and many military officers leave Hungary, and ask asylum in Turkey.
 August 13 – Hungarian Revolution of 1848: The main Hungarian army, under the lead of Arthur Görgey, capitulates to the Russian troops, led by Theodor von Rüdiger, at Világos, ending the Hungarian Revolution.
 August 28 – Venice (the Republic of San Marco) surrenders to Austrian troops after a 4-month siege.
 September 1 – The first segment of the Pennsylvania Railroad, from Lewistown to Harrisburg, opens for service.
 September 17 – African-American abolitionist Harriet Tubman escapes from slavery.

October–December 
 October 4 – Hungarian Revolution of 1848: Komárom, the last bastion of the Hungarian Revolution, surrenders to the Austrian forces.
 October 6 – Hungarian Revolution of 1848: The 13 Martyrs of Arad are executed after the Hungarian War of Independence, in repression by the Austrian authorities led by Julius Jacob von Haynau (these martyrs being the generals of the Hungarian revolutionary army, who did not flee from Hungary after the suppression of the Hungarian revolution by the Russo-Austrian forces). Also today, Lajos Batthyány, the first Hungarian prime minister, is executed by Austrian authorities in Pest.
 November – Austin College receives a charter in Huntsville, Texas.
 November 13
 The Constitution of California is ratified in a general election.
 Swiss-born Marie Manning and her husband Frederick are publicly hanged for the murder of her lover in London, before a crowd of 30,000-50,000.
 November 16 – A Russian court sentences Fyodor Dostoyevsky to death for anti-government activities linked to a radical intellectual group, the Petrashevsky Circle. Facing a firing squad on December 23, the group members are reprieved at the last moment, and exiled to the katorga prison camps in Siberia.
 December 3
 German missionaries Johann Ludwig Krapf and Johannes Rebmann become the first Europeans to see Mount Kenya.
 The Abgeordnetenhaus, lower house of the parliament of the Kingdom of Bavaria, passes a bill granting German Jews the same legal rights as German Christians. The measure draws a strong reaction from Christians across Bavaria, who sign petitions urging the upper house to prevent the equal rights measure from becoming law.
 December 22 – After 17 days of deadlock and 63 votes, Democrat Howell Cobb of Georgia is elected Speaker of the United States House of Representatives, by a plurality of 102 votes to 99 for the former Speaker, the Whig Party's Robert C. Winthrop of Massachusetts. Neither the Democrats nor the Whigs have a majority of the 230 seats in the House, and after neither candidate can obtain the required 116 votes, the Representatives agree that the plurality will decide the leadership.

Date unknown 
 Seven of the "best known" opium clippers go missing: Sylph, Coquette, Kelpie, Greyhound, Don Juan, Mischief, and Anna Eliza.
 Global healthcare and pharmaceutical company Pfizer founded in New York, United States.

Births

January–June 

 January 8 – Stepan Makarov, Russian admiral (d. 1904)
 January 9 – John Hartley, English tennis player, double winner of Wimbledon (d. 1935)
 January 11 – Ignacio Pinazo Camarlench, Spanish impressionist painter (d. 1916)
 January 14 – James Moore, English winner of the first ever cycle race (d. 1935)
 January 18
 Aleksander Świętochowski, Polish writer of the Positivist period (d. 1938)
 Sir Edmund Barton, 1st Prime Minister of Australia (d. 1920)
 January 22 – August Strindberg, Swedish author, playwright, and painter (d. 1912)
 February 13 – Lord Randolph Churchill, British statesman (d. 1895)
 February 18 – Alexander Kielland, Norwegian author (d. 1906)
 February 19 – Giovanni Passannante, Italian anarchist (d. 1910)
 March 6 – Georg Luger, Austrian firearm designer (d. 1923)
 March 7 – Luther Burbank, American biologist, botanist (d. 1926)
 March 10 – Hallie Quinn Brown, African-American educator, writer and activist (d. 1949)
 March 19 – Alfred von Tirpitz, German admiral (d. 1930)
 March 24 – Franz S. Exner, Austrian physicist (d. 1926)
 April 6 – John William Waterhouse, Italian-born British artist (d. 1917)
 April 20 – Nikolai Nebogatov, Russian admiral (d. 1922)
 April 21 – Oscar Hertwig, German zoologist (d. 1922)
 April 24 –
 Emma Whitcomb Babcock, American litterateur and author (d. 1926)
 Helen Taggart Clark, American journalist and poet (unknown year of death)
 Joseph Gallieni, French general (d. 1916)
 April 25 – Felix Klein, German mathematician (d. 1925)
 April 28 – Augusto Aubry, Italian admiral, politician (d. 1912)
 May 1 – Kamimura Hikonojō, Japanese admiral (d. 1916)
 May 3
 Bertha Benz, German automotive pioneer (d. 1944)
 Bernhard von Bülow, 8th Chancellor of Germany (d. 1929)
 May 19 – John Hubbard, American admiral (d. 1932)
 May 22
 Louis Perrier, member of the Swiss Federal Council (d. 1913)
 Sir Aston Webb, British architect (d. 1930)
 May 23 – Károly Khuen-Héderváry, 2-time prime minister of Hungary (d. 1918)
 May 27 – Alzina Stevens, American labor leader, social reformer, and editor (d. 1900)
 June 9 – Michael Ancher, Danish painter (d. 1927)
 June 29 – Pedro Montt, 14th president of Chile (d. 1910)

July–December 
 July 4
 Fernand de Langle de Cary, French general (d. 1927)
 Vladimir Vasilyevich Smirnov, Russian general (d. 1918)
 July 7 – Marguerite Moore, Irish-Catholic orator, patriot, activist (d. unknown)
 July 22 – Emma Lazarus, American author and activist (d. 1887)
 July 29
 Max Nordau, Austrian author, philosopher and Zionist leader (d. 1923)
 Edward Theodore Compton, English-German painter and mountain climber (d. 1921)
 August 28 – Benjamin Godard, French composer (d. 1895)
 September 2 – Emma Curtis Hopkins, American spiritual writer (d. 1925)
 September 3 – Sarah Orne Jewett, American writer (d. 1909)
 September 11 – Sir Edmund Poë, British admiral (d. 1921)
 September 12 – Alexander von Krobatin, Austro-Hungarian field marshal and politician (d. 1933)
 September 14 – Ivan Pavlov, Russian physiologist, recipient of the Nobel Prize in Physiology or Medicine (d. 1936)
 September 18 – Martha Place, American murderer, first woman executed in the electric chair (d. 1899)
 September 21 – Maurice Barrymore, British-American stage actor, playwright (d. 1905)
 September 23 – Hugo von Seeliger, German astronomer (d. 1924)
 October 10 – Mary Baker McQuesten, Canadian letter writer and missionary (d. 1934)
 October 26 – Ferdinand Georg Frobenius, German mathematician (d. 1917)
 October 28 – Oskar Enkvist, Russian admiral (d. 1912)
 October 31 – Marie Louise Andrews, American author and editor (d. 1891)
 November 24 – Frances Hodgson Burnett, English-American playwright, author (d. 1924)
 November 29 – Sir Ambrose Fleming, English electrical engineer, inventor (d. 1945)
 December 5 – Eduard Seler, Prussian scholar, Mesoamericanist (d. 1922)
 December 6 – August von Mackensen, German field marshal (d. 1945)
 December 7 – Saionji Kinmochi, Japanese prince and prime minister (d. 1940)
 December 12 – William Kissam Vanderbilt, American railway magnate (d. 1920)
 December 18 – Laura M. Johns, American suffragist, journalist (d. 1935)
 December 19 – Henry Clay Frick, American industrialist, art collector (d. 1919)
 December 20
 John W. Kern, American politician (d. 1917)
 Raymond P. Rodgers, American admiral (d. 1925)
 December 25 – Nogi Maresuke, Japanese general (d. 1912)

Date unknown 
 Muhammad Abduh, Islamic reformer (d. 1905)
 Elisabeth Cavazza, American author, journalist, and music critic (d. 1926)
 Harriet Abbott Lincoln Coolidge, American philanthropist, author and reformer (d. 1902)
 Ellen Eglin, American inventor
 Pavlos Karolidis, Greek historian (d. 1930)
 Aleksandr Loran, Russian inventor (d. 1911)
 Euphemia Wilson Pitblado, American activist, social reformer, and writer (d. 1928)

Deaths

January–June 

 January 14 – Pierre Roch Jurien de La Gravière, French admiral (b. 1772)
 January 18 – Panoutsos Notaras, Greek politician (b. 1752)
 January 30 – Jonathan Alder, American settler (b. 1773)
 February 8 – France Prešeren, Slovenian poet (b. 1800)
 February 28 – Regina von Siebold, German physician, obstetrician (b. 1771)
 March 14 – King Willem II of the Netherlands (b. 1792)
 March 15 – Giuseppe Caspar Mezzofanti, Italian Catholic cardinal, linguist (b. 1774)
 March 18 – Antonin Moine, French sculptor (b. 1796)
 March 20 – James Justinian Morier, British diplomat, author (b. 1780)
 March 24 – [[Johann Wolfgang 
Döbereiner]], German chemist (b. 1780)
 April 11 – Pedro Ignacio de Castro Barros, Argentine statesman, priest (b. 1777)
 May 10 - Hokusai, Japanese Ukiyo-e Artist (b. 1760)
 May 11
 Juliette Récamier, French socialite (b. 1777)
 Otto Nicolai, German composer, conductor (b. 1810)
 May 22 – Maria Edgeworth, Irish novelist (b. 1767)
 May 25 – Benjamin D'Urban, British general, colonial administrator (b. 1777)
 May 28 – Anne Brontë, English author (b. 1820)
 June 10 – Thomas Robert Bugeaud, Marshal of France, duke of Isly (b. 1784)
 June 15 – James Knox Polk, 53, 11th president of the United States (b. 1795)

July–December 

 July 12 – Dolley Madison, 81, First Lady of the United States (b. 1768)
 July 28 – King Charles Albert of Sardinia (b. 1798)
 July 31 – Sándor Petőfi, Hungarian poet (b. 1823)
 August 2 – Muhammad Ali of Egypt (b. 1769)
 August 23 - Edward Hicks American folk artist (b. 1780)
 September 4 – Friedrich Laun, German novelist (b. 1770)
 September 6 – Andreas Joseph Hofmann, German philosopher and revolutionary (b. 1752)
 September 23 – Mary Elizabeth Lee, American writer (b. 1813)
 September 25 – Johann Strauss, Senior, Austrian composer (b. 1804)
 October 6 – Lajos Batthyány, Hungarian statesman (executed) (b. 1807)
 October 7 – Edgar Allan Poe, American writer (b. 1809)
 October 17 – Frédéric Chopin, Polish-French musician, composer (b. 1810)
 October 22 – William Miller, American Baptist preacher, leader of the Second Advent Movement (b. 1782)
 December 2 – Adelaide of Saxe-Meiningen, queen of William IV of the United Kingdom (b. 1792)

Date unknown 
 Cynthia Taggart, American poet (b. 1801)

References